The Ryot Covered Bridge is a historic wooden covered bridge located at West St. Clair Township in Bedford County, Pennsylvania. It is a low to medium Burr Truss bridge with a shallow gable roof. It is one of 15 historic covered bridges in Bedford County.  It was damaged by fire in 2002, and reconstructed.

It was listed on the National Register of Historic Places in 1980.  A request to remove the bridge from the National Register has been submitted after its being damaged by fire in 2002.

Burning 
The bridge was set on fire by teenage arsonists in 2002. Most of the wooden parts of the bridge were badly damaged. The Ryot Bridge was rehabilitated only seven years earlier, so most of the added steel supports remained intact, along with the stone abutments. The bridge was restored by P. Joseph Lehman, Inc., at a total cost of $300,000.

References 

Covered bridges on the National Register of Historic Places in Pennsylvania
Covered bridges in Bedford County, Pennsylvania
Wooden bridges in Pennsylvania
Bridges in Bedford County, Pennsylvania
National Register of Historic Places in Bedford County, Pennsylvania
Road bridges on the National Register of Historic Places in Pennsylvania
Burr Truss bridges in the United States